Baron Ferdinand Wilhelm Adolf Franz von Plettenberg, lateron Count von Plettenberg und Wittem, commonly referred to as Ferdinand von Plettenberg, born July 25, 1690, in Paderborn, died March 18, 1737, in Vienna was Prime Minister of the Electorate of Cologne, Treasurer and Hereditary Marshal of Prince-elector Clemens August of Bavaria and an important supporter of Maria Theresa in the succession to the throne for the Habsburgian Erblande.

References 

1690 births
1737 deaths
House of Plettenberg
Counts of the Holy Roman Empire
Knights of the Golden Fleece
People from Paderborn